Safety cap may refer to:
 Safety cap (helmet), hatgear used in mining etc.
 Safety cap (medicine) or child-resistant packaging, a cap found on medicine bottles designed to be hard for a child to remove

 Safety capacitor, a type of capacitor